Saw Min Phyu (1415–?) was a princess of Ava. She was the youngest daughter of the famous Crown Prince Minye Kyawswa, and the mother of Queen Saw Myat Lay of Prome.

Brief
Saw Min Hla was the youngest daughter of Crown Prince Minye Kyawswa and Saw Min Hla. She never knew her father as she was born in the year in which her father fell in action. She later became the third wife of Saw Shwe Khet, her much older half cousin, twice removed. She and Shwe Khet had three children together: Gov. Minye Kyawswa I of Kale, Queen Saw Myat Lay of Prome, and Princess Myat Hpone Pyo of Tharrawaddy.

Ancestry
The princess was descended from Ava, Pagan, and Mohnyin royal lines from her father's side.

Notes

References

Bibliography
 
 
 

Ava dynasty
Burmese people of Shan descent